Blind Pass is the strait that separates Captiva Island from Sanibel Island in Lee County, Florida.

References 

Landforms of Lee County, Florida
Straits of Florida
Sanibel, Florida
Captiva Island